Léo Lévesque is a French Canadian poet, essayist, and writer born in Montreal, Quebec. He was a finalist for the 1982 Governor General's Award for Literary Merit, and won $10,000 funding in 1997–98 from the Canada Council for the Arts.

He spent 25 years in prison, and has written five collections of prison stories based on his experience, of which Contes en coups de poing was the basis of the 2002 movie Inside (Histoire de pen).

References

Living people
20th-century Canadian poets
Canadian male poets
Writers from Montreal
French Quebecers
Canadian poets in French
Canadian male essayists
Canadian dramatists and playwrights in French
Canadian male dramatists and playwrights
20th-century Canadian dramatists and playwrights
20th-century Canadian essayists
20th-century Canadian male writers
Year of birth missing (living people)
Canadian non-fiction writers in French